Taste receptor 2 member 38 is a protein that in humans is encoded by the TAS2R38 gene.  TAS2R38 is a bitter taste receptor; varying genotypes of TAS2R38 influence the ability to taste both 6-n-propylthiouracil (PROP) and phenylthiocarbamide (PTC).  Though it has often been proposed that varying taste receptor genotypes could influence tasting ability, TAS2R38 is one of the few taste receptors shown to have this function.

Signal transduction 

As with all TAS2R proteins, TAS2R38 utilizes the G-protein gustducin as its primary method of signal transduction.  Both the α- and βγ-subunits are crucial to the transmission of the taste signal.  See: taste receptor.

PTC sensitivity 

Differential ability to taste the bitter compound phenylthiocarbamide (PTC) was discovered more than 80 years ago.  Since then, PTC tasting ability has been mapped to chromosome 7q and, several years later, was shown to be directly related to TAS2R38 genotype.  There are three common polymorphisms in the TAS2R38 gene—A49P, V262A, and I296V—which combine to form two common haplotypes and several other very rare haplotypes.  The two common haplotypes are AVI (often called “nontaster”) and PAV (often called “taster”).  Varying combinations of these haplotypes will yield homozygotes—PAV/PAV and AVI/AVI—and heterozygotes—PAV/AVI.  These genotypes can account for up to 85% of the variation in PTC tasting ability: people possessing two copies of the PAV polymorphism report PTC to be more bitter than TAS2R38 heterozygotes, and people possessing two copies of the AVI/AVI polymorphism often report PTC as being essentially tasteless.  These polymorphisms are hypothesized to affect taste by altering G-protein-binding domains.

Because bitter substances are usually toxic, the presence of a “nontaster” geno- and phenotype seems evolutionarily undesirable.  Several studies have suggested, however, that the AVI polymorphism may code for an entirely new receptor which processes a different and as-yet undiscovered bitter compound.  Furthermore, the presence of the nontaster allele may reflect the desirability of maintaining a mostly heterozygous population; this group of people may possess flexibility in their bitter taste perception, enabling them to avoid a greater number of toxins than either homozygotic group.  Other studies, however, suggest that the AVI nontaster genotype has no functional ligand. For an evolutionary perspective, the reference sequences for gorillas and chimps have the PAV haplotype, while mouse and rat have PAI.

This genotypical alteration of taste phenotype is currently unique to TAS2R38.  Though genotype has been proposed as a mechanism for determining individual taste preferences, TAS2R38 is so far the first and only taste receptor to display this property.

Food containing PROP 
The perceived bitterness of cruciferous vegetables, such as broccoli, results from glucosinolates and their hydrolysis products, particularly isothiocyanates and other sulfur-containing compounds. Preliminary research indicates that genetic inheritance through the gene TAS2R38 may be responsible in part for bitter taste perception in broccoli.

As with watercress, mustard greens, turnip, broccoli and horseradish, human perception of bitterness in rutabaga is governed by a gene affecting the TAS2R bitter receptor, which detects the glucosinolates in rutabaga. Sensitive individuals with the genotype PAV/PAV (supertasters) find rutabaga twice as bitter as insensitive subjects (AVI/AVI). The difference for the mixed type (PAV/AVI) is insignificant for rutabaga. As a result, sensitive individuals may find some rutabagas too bitter to eat.

PROP sensitivity, supertasting, and alcoholism

The TAS2R38 protein also confers sensitivity to the bitter compound 6-n-propylthiouracil (PROP).  Because perception of PROP bitterness has been associated with supertasting, and because TAS2R38 genotypes associate with PROP-tasting phenotypes, it has been proposed that TAS2R38 genotypes may have a role in supertasting capabilities. It appears that while TAS2R38 genotypes determine a threshold of PROP tasting abilities, the genotypes cannot account for the differences in tasting amongst each threshold group.  For example, some PAV/PAV homozygotes perceive PROP to be more bitter than others, and TAS2R38 genotype cannot account for these differences.  Furthermore, some heterozygotes may become PROP supertasters (despite a lack of two PAV alleles), indicating overlap between PROP bitterness levels and varying TAS2R38 genotypes.  These results illustrate that a mechanism beyond TAS2R38 genotype contributes to supertasting capabilities.

Because fungiform papillae (FP) number varies with PROP bitterness, TAS2R38 genotype was also suspected to alter FP number.  Again, however, TAS2R38 genotype could not explain FP alterations.  Additionally, FP number was not a strong predictor of PROP bitterness amongst TAS2R38 heterozygotes, indicating, again, a lack of knowledge about the relationship between PROP bitterness, TAS2R38, and supertasting.  Research is leaning toward a second receptor with PROP sensitivity that confers supertasting abilities.

PROP bitterness and TAS2R38 genotype have been further examined in relation to alcohol intake.  Research has suggested that the level of alcohol consumption may correlate with the level of perceived bitterness of ethanol; those people who find PROP to be more bitter also find the taste of ethanol to be less pleasant.  Again, however, correlates between TAS2R38 genotype and the taste of alcohol were not significant: the TAS2R38 genotype could not predict the intensity of alcohol bitterness (though PROP bitterness did correlate with alcohol bitterness). Genotype could predict alcohol intake; those with nontaster alleles were more likely to consume more alcohol over the course of the year.  Again, a second genetic factor seems to contribute to these phenomena.  A gene altering the density of fungiform papillae may provide this second factor.

See also 
 Supertaster
 Taste receptor

References

Further reading

External links 
 
 TAS2R38 Gene Card
 TAS2R38 OMIM Page

Human taste receptors